Jim Mathieson may refer to:

 Jim Mathieson (ice hockey) (born 1970), Canadian ice hockey player
 Jim Mathieson (footballer) (1892–1982), Australian rules footballer
 Jim Mathieson (sculptor) (1931–2003), British sculptor

See also
 James Mathieson (1905–1950), Scottish football goalkeeper
 Jamie Mathieson (born 1970), British television screenwriter